Chhote Sarkar may refer to:

Chhote Sarkar (1938 film)
Chhote Sarkar (1961 film)
Chhote Sarkar (1974 film)
Chhote Sarkar (1996 film), a 1996 Bollywood romantic drama film